Edmonton Riverbend is a federal electoral district in Alberta. 
Edmonton Riverbend was created by the 2012 federal electoral boundaries redistribution and was legally defined in the 2013 representation order. It came into effect upon the call of the 42nd Canadian federal election, scheduled for October 2015. It was created out of part of the electoral district of Edmonton—Leduc. On October 19, 2015 Matt Jeneroux was the first elected Member of Parliament for the Electoral District receiving 50% of the vote.

Members of Parliament

This riding has elected the following members of the House of Commons of Canada:

Election results

References

Alberta federal electoral districts
Politics of Edmonton